Howard Baker (1925–2014) was a U.S. senator from Tennessee and ambassador to Japan.

Howard Baker may also refer to:

Howard Baker (baseball) (1888–1964), Major League Baseball player
Benjamin Howard Baker (1892–1987), English association football player and high jumper
Howard Baker (poet) (1905–1990), American poet
Howard Baker Sr. (1902–1964), U.S. representative

See also
Benjamin Howard Baker (1892–1987), footballer
Howard H. Baker Jr. Center for Public Policy, Knoxville, Tennessee